The 1942 United States Senate election in Minnesota took place on November 3, 1942. Incumbent Republican Joseph H. Ball, who had been temporarily appointed by Governor Harold Stassen in 1940 to fill the seat of the deceased Farmer–Labor U.S. Senator Ernest Lundeen, defeated Farmer–Labor former U.S. Senator and former Governor Elmer Benson, independent candidate Martin A. Nelson, and Democratic nominee Ed Murphy, to win election to the full six-year term beginning in January 1943. A special election held on the same date elected Republican nominee Arthur E. Nelson to serve the remainder of Lundeen's unexpired term.

Following his 1940 appointment and subsequent election, Ball ultimately served the longest tenure of any Senator only elected once.

Farmer–Labor primary

Candidates

Declared
 Henry Arens, Former U.S. Representative (1933-1935) and 26th Lieutenant Governor of Minnesota (1931-1933)
 Elmer A. Benson, 24th Governor of Minnesota (1937-1939) and former U.S. Senator (1935-1936)
 Norma Ward Lundeen (named "Mrs. Ernest Lundeen" on the ballot), widow of Ernest Lundeen
 Herbert L. Millington

Results

Republican primary

Candidates

Declared
 Joseph H. Ball, Incumbent U.S. Senator since 1940
 Walter K. Mickelson, New Ulm-area publisher
 Harson A. Northrop
 Henry J. Soltau, Methodist pastor and ardent prohibitionist

Results

General election

Results

See also 
 United States Senate elections, 1942

References

Minnesota
1942
1942 Minnesota elections